Schalkau is a town in the district of Sonneberg, in Thuringia, Germany. It is situated 13 km west of Sonneberg, and 15 km north of Coburg. The former municipality Bachfeld was merged into Schalkau in December 2019.

Transportation

Schalkau has two train stations, Schalkau and Schalkau Mitte, on the Hinterland Railway (Hinterlandbahn) from Sonneberg Hauptbahnhof to Eisfeld. There is also a regular bus service to Sonneberg.

Education

There is one secondary school, educating pupils 11-16 (ordinarily) which falls into the 'Realschule' category. The school is named after the famous German writer, Goethe. There is a post office and a few other facilities.

Town division
The town has 10 districts:

Inhabitants
Number of inhabitants (as of 31 December):

Source since 1994: Thuringia statistical office Erfurt

Personalities 
 Jan Eichhorn (born 1981), luger
 Maximilian Mörlin (1516-1584), Protestant theologian and reformer
 David Möller (born 1982), luger 
 Fritz Mueller (1907-2001), aerospace engineer

References

Sonneberg (district)
Duchy of Saxe-Meiningen